William Chamberleyn  was an Oxford college head in the 15th-century.

Chamberleyn was the inaugural Rector of Lincoln College, Oxford.

References

Rectors of Lincoln College, Oxford
15th-century English people